Swayamvara is a 1973 Indian Kannada-language film, directed by Y. R. Swamy and produced by C. R. Basavaraju. The film stars Rajkumar, N. Bharathi, Balakrishna and Dinesh. The film has musical score by Rajan–Nagendra. The movie is based on a novel of same name by Ma. Na. Murthy.

Plot
Bharati, is a young socialite who learns she will not inherit the family's wealth. She doesn't want to marry, but her father's will explicitly mentions that without marriage, she will lose the family estate. Balakrishna, her lawyer and trusted adviser sees the news in the paper about Rajkumar, who is a convict about to be hanged. Bharati marries Dr. Rajkumar, just to claim her ancestral wealth. The day before the hanging, the killer reveals on his death-bed, that Rajkumar is innocent. Rajkumar is released, just as he is to be hanged. Rajkumar thinks it was the marital bliss that changed his fortunes. Anguished that her plans are thwarted, Bharati cries and accuses Rajkumar of plotting. Being the simpleton he is, Rajkumar mentions he only came to thank her and walks away from her life. Bharati's suitor Dinesh turns up to entice Bharati and enquire on when the estate will be in Bharati's name. The clause inserted in the will shocks them. Bharati must lead a marital life with her husband for at least one month.

Dinesh and Bharati plot to implicate Rajkumar so as to gain hold of the estate.

Rajkumar is a daily wage labourer, struggling all day in coal-mine for 3 1/4 rupees a day. He has to take care of his sister and now, his supposed-wife. Bharati is introduced to the difficulties of life and learns the value of labour, hard-earned savings, love and life. She is of two minds as to whether to stay as Rajkumar's wife or be part of the plan she hatched to gain riches. On the last day of the agreed stay, Rajkumar's ears are filled with the plot. Rajkumar is dejected, when he learns his wife is in fact is staying with him, only to claim her estate. Bharati saves a kid's life and decides to stay as Rajkumar's wife. Rajkumar, is no mood to listen and asks her to move away from his life. Dejected, Bharati leaves to the city. In the climax, Dinesh and Bharati come to collect Rajkumar's signatures on divorce papers. An accident at the coal mine leads to cave-ins, blocking the way out of coal mines. Rajkumar, Dinesh and Bharati are trapped and to make way, one person has to stay back and fire the dynamite to make way. Rajkumar taunts Dinesh to stay back and prove his love to save Bharati. Dinesh is found out to be self-serving and wouldn't want to risk his life. Rajkumar mentions to Bharati he has signed the divorce papers and says she is free to lead her life. He rushes to make way. Providence saves Rajkumar for the second time, leading Bharati to remark, she has chosen Rajkumar not for the first time in the jail, when he was due to die, but also now, in the face of death. Rajkumar and Bharati happily unite and walk towards their humble home.

Cast

 Rajkumar as Natraj
 N. Bharathi as Vasanta Devi
 Balakrishna as Nanjundaiyya
 Dinesh as Swami
 Raghavendra Rao as Advocate Seetaramaiyya
 Bangalore Nagesh as Chilre
 Sathya as Mooga
 Kunigal Nagabhushan as servant in Vasanta Devi's house
 Sampangi
 Bheema Rao
 Srinivas
 Bhushan
 Shani Mahadevappa as Basappa
 Pramela Joshai [approaches Vasanta Devi for Gulbarga Drought help]
 Chikka Veerayya
 Padmanabh
 Nawab
 Siddamallayya
 V. Doreswamy
 Kunigal Ramanath
 Jayashree as Gauramma
 Kala
 Nagarathnamma
 Jyothi
 B. Jaya
 Kamala
 Rajina
 Pushpa
 Sushila Naidu
 Ananthamani
 Sampath as Venkappa in a guest appearance

Soundtrack
The music was composed by Rajan–Nagendra.

References

Additional Information 
Few scenes were shot in Bharat Gold Mines [K.G.F] and Bengaluru Central Jail [its now converted into Freedom Park]

External links
 
 

1973 films
1970s Kannada-language films
Films scored by Rajan–Nagendra
Films directed by Y. R. Swamy